Alternativa Popular Canaria (APC) is a Canarian nationalist leftist party founded in 2002, and part of the Movimiento de Liberación Nacional Canario (MLNC). Its creation was spurred by the youth organisation Azarug and several municipal parties, as well as members of various leftist nationalist parties.

ASAVA, a municipal party which stood for Valsequillo in Gran Canaria, and the leftist independence party Unidad del Pueblo, while not members of APC, have collaborated with that party in certain matters.

History
In the municipal elections of 2003, APC gained a council seat in the municipality of Santa Úrsula (Tenerife). In La Orotava they ran as Iniciativa por La Orotava (IPO) along with Los Verdes de Canarias, obtaining five council seats. In the European Parliament elections of June 2004, APC backed Europa de los Pueblos. The party held its second National Assembly 25–26 June 2005, and its third on 16 September 2006. In 2006 a split within the party in Tenerife produced the offshoot Canarian Nationalist Alternative.

APT participated in the 2007 Canarian Parliament elections, in coalition with the Alternativa Ciudadana 25 de Mayo, but failed to gain any seats. In the 2007 Spanish municipal elections they lost their seat in Santa Úrsula (the local branch having split from the party) but won three seats in La Orotava.

The Cabildo of Tenerife, as well as the municipalities of Santa Cruz de Tenerife, San Cristobal de La Laguna, Granadilla de Abona, Buenavista del Norte and Tacoronte, supported Alternativa Sí Se Puede por Tenerife, a political option into which APC was integrated. In the 2009 European Parliament elections, the APC backed Iniciativa Internacionalista, an extreme-left Spanish coalition.

In its fourth National Assembly, APC decided not to stand in any further elections, remaining instead within the Alternativa Sí Se Puede por Tenerife. Since APC does not condemn the past violent policies of MPAIAC, it is viewed by local rightist parties as one of the groups that seek to minimize terrorism in the Canary Islands.

See also
Canarian nationalism
 MPAIAC

References

External links
 

Socialist parties in Spain
Political parties in the Canary Islands
Regionalist parties in Spain
Canarian nationalist parties
Left-wing nationalist parties
Political parties established in 2002
2002 establishments in Spain